The Albanian Mixed Martial Arts Federation (AMMAF or FSHNJ) is the head governing body for the sport of professional MMA and promotion of this sport in Albania.

The AMMAF was founded in 2012 by Arjan Rizaj (currently President of the AMMAF) to improve and promote the MMA in the country, such as boxing; wrestling; kickboxing; Brazilian Jiu Jitsu and others martial arts. The Federation is also recognized by the Ministry of Education and Sport and is a member of the International Mixed Martial Arts Federation (IMMAF).

History

The Albanian Mixed Martial Arts Federation was founded in 2012 and is a full-fledged member of the International Mixed Martial Arts Federation (IMMAF).

See also 
 Sports in Albania

References

External links
 

MMA
Mixed martial arts organizations